Martín Jaite defeated Diego Pérez 6–4, 6–2 to win the 1985 Buenos Aires Grand Prix singles competition. Guillermo Vilas was the champion but did not defend his title.

Seeds

  Diego Pérez (final)
  Alejandro Ganzábal (first round)
  Martín Jaite (champion)
  Hans Gildemeister (first round)
  Horacio de la Peña (semifinals)
  Jimmy Brown (semifinals)
  Eduardo Bengoechea (first round)
  Roberto Argüello (quarterfinals)

Draw

Finals

Top half

Bottom half

External links
 1985 ATP Buenos Aires Singles draw

Singles